This is a list of seasons played by Arsenal W.F.C., the women's section of English football club Arsenal F.C. since its creation in 1987.

Key
Key to league competitions:

 FA Women's Super League (WSL) – England's top women's football league, established in 2011.
 FA Women's Premier League National Division (Prem) – The first tier of English women's football until the inception of the WSL in 2011. It was scrapped after the 2012–13 season and effectively replaced with the FA Women's Championship.
 FA Women's Premier League Southern Division (Prem South) – The second tier of English women's football until the inception of the WSL in 2011, when it became the third tier.

Key to colours and symbols:

Key to league record:
 Season = The year and article of the season
 Pos = Final position
 Pld = Games played
 W = Games won
 D = Games drawn
 L = Games lost
 GF = Goals scored
 GA = Goals against
 Pts = Points

Key to cup record:
 En-dash (–) = Arsenal did not participate
 DNE = The club did not enter cup play
 QR1 = First qualification round
 QR2 = Second qualification round, etc.
 Group = Group stage
 GS2 = Second group stage
 R1 = First round
 R2 = Second round, etc.
 R16 = Round of 16
 QF = Quarter-finals
 SF = Semi-finals
 RU = Runners-up
 W = Winners

Seasons

Footnotes

References

women's seasons
Arsenal F.C.
Arsenal